Molly S. Shoichet , is a Canadian science professor, specializing in chemistry, biomaterials and biomedical engineering. She was Ontario's first Chief Scientist. Shoichet is a biomedical engineer known for her work in tissue engineering, and is the only person to be a fellow of the three National Academies in Canada.

Education 
Shoichet studied at the Massachusetts Institute of Technology and received her bachelor's degree in chemistry in 1987. She attended the University of Massachusetts Amherst for her doctoral studies and earned her PhD in polymer science and engineering in 1992.

Career 
After receiving her doctorate, Shoichet joined the faculty of Brown University as an adjunct professor, while simultaneously working in industry. Shoichet joined the University of Toronto in 1995, where she remains as of 2019. Her work includes tissue and polymer engineering, focusing on drug delivery and tissue regeneration. Early in her career, she studied the blood–brain barrier. Her lab's methods involve using a gel to deliver drugs to a specific location in the central nervous system and to bypass the blood-brain barrier. The drugs delivered in this way include chemotherapy drugs and agents to slow or reverse damage from a stroke. This delivery method is also being tested with stem cells, and include studies on the use of hydrogels that deliver stem cells to nonfunctioning retinas. These hydrogels are designed to be easily injectable into the tissue and they then form a scaffold for cells to grow in the appropriate three-dimensional shape.

In 2015, Shoichet co-founded Research2Reality to showcase scientific research in Canada through a combination of accessible blog posts and short videos. She has also curated the "Artful Science" exhibit at the Toronto Pearson International Airport.

In November 2017, Shoichet was named as Ontario's first Chief Scientist by then Premier Kathleen Wynne. She was leading a team of six to build connections between the federal government, science and business sectors, and promote the use of evidence in policy development.

On 3 July 2018, Shoichet was dismissed from her position by the newly elected Conservative government of Ontario when the office of chief scientist was eliminated.

Honours and awards 
In 2010, Shoichet was one of 30 people to be awarded the Order of Ontario.

Shoichet was the North American recipient of the L'Oréal-UNESCO Awards for Women in Science in 2015 for her work on regeneration of nerve tissue, and in developing direct drug delivery methods for the spinal cord and brain using novel materials. She has advocated for women in science and women professors.

The University of Toronto designated her a "University Professor" in 2014. She is the only person to be a fellow of the three National Academies in Canada. The University of Toronto also honored her in 2013 as an "Inventor of the Year". She is the 2017 winner of the Kalev Pugi Award of the Chemical Institute of Canada. She holds the Canada Research Chair in Tissue Engineering.

In 2017, she was also awarded the Killam Prize for engineering. She was awarded Officer of the Order of Canada (OC) as per Government House of 29 December 2017.

In 2020, she was the winner of the Gerhard Herzberg Canada Gold Medal for Science and Engineering, awarded by the Natural Sciences and Engineering Research Council of Canada (NSERC).

Other honours 
 Fellow, American Association for the Advancement of Science (2013)
 Queen Elizabeth II Diamond Jubilee Medal (2013)
 Fellow, Canadian Academy of Sciences of the Royal Society of Canada
 Fellow, Canadian Academy of Engineering
 Fellow, Canadian Academy of Health Sciences
 Tissue Engineering and Regenerative Medicine International Society (TERMIS) Senior Scientist Award (2014)
 Fellow, Royal Society UK

Selected publications

See also 

Women in chemistry

References 

Engineers from Toronto
Scientists from Toronto
Living people
Massachusetts Institute of Technology School of Science alumni
University of Massachusetts Amherst College of Engineering alumni
Canadian biomedical engineers
Canadian women chemists
Jewish Canadian scientists
Members of the Order of Ontario
Officers of the Order of Canada
Fellows of the American Association for the Advancement of Science
Fellows of the Canadian Academy of Engineering
Brown University faculty
Academic staff of the University of Toronto
Fellows of the Royal Society of Canada
L'Oréal-UNESCO Awards for Women in Science laureates
20th-century women engineers
20th-century Canadian chemists
21st-century women engineers
21st-century Canadian chemists
20th-century Canadian engineers
21st-century Canadian engineers
Female Fellows of the Royal Society
20th-century Canadian women scientists
21st-century Canadian women scientists
1965 births
Canadian Fellows of the Royal Society